The Virgin Missing Adventures were a series of novels from Virgin Publishing based on the British science-fiction television series Doctor Who, which had been cancelled in 1989, featuring stories set between televised episodes of the programme. The novels were published from 1994 to 1997, and featured the First through Sixth Doctors. (The Seventh Doctor also appeared in one novel.) The Missing Adventures complemented the Virgin New Adventures range, which had proved successful.

Publication history
Virgin had purchased the successful children's imprint Target Books in 1989, with Virgin's new fiction editor Peter Darvill-Evans taking over the range. Target's major output was novelisations of televised Doctor Who stories, and Darvill-Evans realised that there were few stories left to be novelised. He approached the BBC for permission to commission original stories written directly for print, but such a licence was initially refused. However, after the television series was cancelled at the end of 1989, Virgin were granted the licence to produce full-length original novels continuing the story from the point at which the series had concluded. Virgin New Adventures#cite note-Bookwyrm-4

The first range covered only the continuing adventures of the Seventh Doctor, but when that proved successful, Virgin also created this range covering the previous Doctors, with new stories that fit in between the televised serials. [Here's your citation: https://doctorwho.org.nz/archive/tsv39/missingadventures.html]

In addition to original novels, the Missing Adventures series also incorporated two novelisations: The Ghosts of N-Space, based upon a mid-1990s BBC audio play, and Downtime, which was based upon an independent video production featuring several characters from the Doctor Who series (the novelisation is one of the few Doctor Who novels in which the Doctor does not appear as a central character).

When the BBC decided in 1996 to do their own line of novels with the Eighth Doctor, they withdrew the license from Virgin to publish the Eighth Doctor Adventures. The adventures of the previous Doctors were taken up by the BBC in the Past Doctor Adventures line of books.

Reprints 
In 2014, both The Scales of Injustice and The Sands of Time were reprinted as part of BBC Books' The Monster Collection. These were followed with The English Way of Death, a part of The History Collection (2015).

List of Virgin Missing Adventures
Including books featuring two of the Doctors, the total tallies are: First Doctor, 5 books; Second, 5 books; Third, 6 books; Fourth, 9 books; Fifth, 5 books; Sixth, 5 books; and Seventh, 1 book.

Continuity 
Three of the Missing Adventures were sequels to televised serials, they were:
The Sands of Time — Pyramids of Mars
The Shadow of Weng-Chiang — The Talons of Weng-Chiang
Twilight of the Gods — The Web Planet

Two of the Missing Adventures were novelisations:
The Ghosts of N-Space — the BBC Radio audio drama The Ghosts of N-Space
Downtime — the Reeltime Pictures direct-to-video spin-off Downtime, featuring the Great Intelligence and forming a sequel to The Abominable Snowmen (1967) and The Web of Fear (1968).

Many Missing Adventures featured old foes, including:
Killing Ground — The Cybermen
The Dark Path — The Master
The Scales of Injustice — The Silurians
Lords of the Storm — The Sontarans
State of Change — The Rani
Millennial Rites — The Valeyard
The Well-Mannered War — The Black Guardian
The Romance of Crime — The Ogrons
Speed of Flight is the only novel in the series that is a prequel; to Timelash.

Who Killed Kennedy

In 1996, Virgin Books published Who Killed Kennedy, a Doctor Who novel by David Bishop. Although set during the time of the Third Doctor, Virgin published this book as a standalone work and not as part of the Missing Adventures series.

External links
The Doctor Who Bewildering Reference Guide – a guide to continuity references in selected Doctor Who original novels.
The Cloister Library – commentaries on selected Doctor Who original novels, named and modeled after The Discontinuity Guide by Cornell, Day and Topping
 – a guide to Doctor Who original novels.
The TARDIS Library's listing of Missing Adventures

 
Book series introduced in 1994